Yana Kachur (born 13 January 1997) is a Ukrainian sprinter. She represented her country at the 2017 World Championships narrowly missing the semifinals. Additionally, she won two medals at the 2017 European U23 Championships.

International competitions

Personal bests

Outdoor
100 metres – 11.51 (+1.2 m/s, Almaty 2016)
200 metres – 23.20 (+1.3 m/s, Bydgoszcz 2017)
400 metres – 53.96 (Kirovograd 2016)

Indoor
60 metres – 7.50 (Kyiv 2016)
200 metres – 24.63 (Kyiv 2017)
400 metres – 54.47 (Sumy 2018)

References

1997 births
Living people
Ukrainian female sprinters
World Athletics Championships athletes for Ukraine
Athletes (track and field) at the 2014 Summer Youth Olympics
Athletes (track and field) at the 2019 European Games
European Games medalists in athletics
European Games gold medalists for Ukraine
Sportspeople from Kirovohrad Oblast
20th-century Ukrainian women
21st-century Ukrainian women